Peter Joseph Doyle (born 24 August 1973) is a former Australian rules footballer who played with Fitzroy in the Australian Football League (AFL).

Doyle was initially drafted by Carlton, with their second pick and 21st overall in the 1989 National Draft. He served a long apprenticeship in the reserves but was delisted without making his senior debut. Instead he played senior football at Fitzroy, which selected him in the 1994 Pre-Season Draft. Doyle appeared in the final five rounds of the 1995 AFL season and his six appearances in 1996 included Fitzroy's final league game, against Fremantle. All of his 12 league appearances came in losses.

References

External links
 
 

1973 births
Australian rules footballers from Victoria (Australia)
Fitzroy Football Club players
Living people